Mootwingee County, New South Wales is one of the 141 cadastral divisions of New South Wales.

Mootwingee is believed to be derived from a local Aboriginal word and is also the name of a nearby pastoral station, now a part of Mutawintji National Park; and of a landmark for the aboriginal people.

Parishes 

The parishes found within this county do not fall within a Local Government Area as the county lies within the Unincorporated Far West Region. A full list of the county's parishes and mapping coordinates to the approximate centre of each location is as follows:

References

Counties of New South Wales